Podgorensky is an urban locality (an urban-type settlement) and the administrative center of Podgorensky District of Voronezh Oblast, Russia. Population:

History
A cement plant was built in Podgorensky in 1932 during the first Five Year Plan. In the 1950s and 1960s it underwent a major overhaul increasing its annual capacity to 612 thousand tons.

References

Urban-type settlements in Voronezh Oblast
Populated places in Podgorensky District